Open Sky is a 2000 album from the Progressive rock band Iona.

Open Sky may also refer to:

Transportation 
ASEAN Open Sky Agreement, an aviation policy
Open-wheel car, called an open sky car
OpenSky M-02, Japanese project to create a "Möwe" jet-powered glider
OpenSky Network, non-commercial, research-oriented flight tracking platform

Music 
Open Sky, progressive rock album by Iona,
Open Sky Records, recording company and label Open Sky used by Iona

Other 
Project Open Sky, series of flight simulator programs
OpenSky, wireless communication system invented in Massachusetts
OpenSky service, hosted SIP (Session Initiation Protocol) to Skype gateway
The Open Sky or El cielo abierto, 2000 Spanish movie

See also
Open skies (disambiguation)
Sky Open, men's squash tournament, Cairo, Egypt